Kori is an Indian caste, who were traditionally weavers. Other names for this caste include  Kamal, Kamalvansi and Shankhawar.

The Koris are classified as a Scheduled Caste in the states of Himachal Pradesh, Uttar Pradesh and Uttarakhand. The name "Kori" derives from the word "kora" (clean cloth), which refers to their traditional occupation.

Harold Gould noted in his research of the jajmani system in Uttar Pradesh that by the 1960s, all of the Koris in the villages studied by him had adopted roles as agriculturist, ploughmen, and midwives, because industrialisation had made their traditional occupation as weavers redundant.

The Kori scheduled caste population in Uttar Pradesh at the 2011 census of India was 2,293,937.

References 

Weaving communities of South Asia
Scheduled Castes of Uttar Pradesh
Scheduled Castes of Himachal Pradesh
Scheduled Castes of Uttarakhand